Lucas Alexandre Galdino de Azevedo (born 26 February 2001), commonly known as Lucão, is a Brazilian footballer who plays as a goalkeeper for Red Bull Bragantino.

Career statistics

Club

Notes

Honours

International
Brazil U23
Summer Olympics: 2020

References

External links

2001 births
Living people
Brazilian footballers
Association football goalkeepers
Campeonato Brasileiro Série A players
Campeonato Brasileiro Série B players
CR Vasco da Gama players
Brazil youth international footballers
Olympic footballers of Brazil
Footballers at the 2020 Summer Olympics
Olympic medalists in football
Olympic gold medalists for Brazil
Medalists at the 2020 Summer Olympics
Sportspeople from Rio de Janeiro (state)
People from Barra Mansa